The 1857 Texas gubernatorial election was held on August 3, 1857 to elect the governor of Texas. The election pitted Lieutenant Governor Hardin Richard Runnels against former President of the Republic of Texas Sam Houston and Lieutenant Governor hopeful French Smith. Runnels won the election with 53% of the vote, becoming the only person to ever defeat Sam Houston in a political contest.

Results

References

1857
Texas
Gubernatorial
August 1857 events
Sam Houston